Goupia is a neotropical genus of flowering plants and the sole genus included in the family Goupiaceae. There are three species, all found in tropical northern South America.

Species
Goupia cinerascens
Goupia glabra (syn. G. paraensis, G. tomentosa)
Goupia guatemalensis

The genus was previously included in the family Celastraceae, in the order Celastrales.

References

Malpighiales
Malpighiales genera
Flora of Brazil